John Calvin (born November 29, 1947) is an American film and television actor. He played Howie Dickerson in the short-lived television sitcom The Paul Lynde Show. He also played Justin Hooke in the miniseries The Dark Secret of Harvest Home and Reverend Willie Boom in the adventure drama Tales of the Gold Monkey.

Calvin guest-starred in numerous television programs including Taxi, Night Court, Quantum Leap, The A-Team, Murder, She Wrote, In the Heat of the Night and Hart to Hart''.

Filmography

Film

Television

References

External links 

Rotten Tomatoes profile

1947 births
People from Staten Island
Male actors from New York City
American male television actors
American male film actors
20th-century American male actors
Living people